Paul Michael New (born 30 September 1953) is a former English cricketer.  New was a right-handed batsman who bowled right-arm medium-fast.  He was born at Wokingham, Berkshire.

New made his Minor Counties Championship debut for Berkshire in 1974 against Wiltshire.  From 1974 to 1987, he represented the county in 47 Minor Counties Championship matches, the last of which came in the 1987 Championship when Berkshire played Cheshire.  New also played in the MCCA Knockout Trophy for Berkshire.  His debut in that competition came in 1983 when Berkshire played Norfolk.  From 1983 to 1987, he represented the county in 9 Trophy matches, the last of which came when Berkshire played Buckinghamshire in the 1987 MCCA Knockout Trophy.

Additionally, he also played List-A matches for Berkshire.  His List-A debut for the county came against Yorkshire in the 1983 NatWest Trophy.  From 1983 to 1986, he represented the county in 4 List-A matches, with his final List-A match coming in the 1986 NatWest Trophy when Berkshire played Gloucestershire at Courages Cricket Ground in Reading.  In his 4 matches, he took 6 wickets at a bowling average of 25.33, with best figures of 3/58.

References

External links
Paul New at Cricinfo
Paul New at CricketArchive

1953 births
Living people
People from Wokingham
English cricketers
Berkshire cricketers